The 1830–31 United States House of Representatives elections were held on various dates in various states between July 5, 1830 and October 3, 1831. Each state set its own date for its elections to the House of Representatives before the first session of the 22nd United States Congress convened on December 5, 1831. Elections were held for all 213 seats, representing 24 states.

The supporters of President Andrew Jackson lost ten seats during his first term, but managed to maintain control of the chamber amidst the growth of two new opposition movements.

The brash style of Congress during the administration of Jackson caused a number of Americans to become dissatisfied with the government and both of the major parties. Anger over the Tariff of 1828 also provided a major issue, particularly in the agricultural South. The Jacksonians remained firmly in control of the House, but lost several seats, as did the minority Anti-Jacksonians. The Anti-Masonic Party, an aspiring third party which was based on a single issue (distrust of Freemasonry), was actually able to gain a dozen seats, and four South Carolina Congressman who called themselves Nullifiers (based on the principle of states' rights) were also elected. Thus, this was the first election in the House where both major parties lost seats at the same time; this would not occur again until the 1854 elections.

Election summaries 

Not including special elections.

Special elections

21st Congress 

|-
! 
| James W. Ripley
|  | Jacksonian
| 1826 
|  | Incumbent resigned March 12, 1830.New member elected September 13, 1830.Jacksonian hold.Successor seated December 6, 1830.
| nowrap | 

|-
! 
| John M. Goodenow
|  | Jacksonian
| 1828
|  | Incumbent resigned April 9, 1830, after being appointed judge of the Supreme Court of Ohio.New member elected October 11, 1830.Winner was elected the next day to the next term, see below.Successor seated December 6, 1830.
| nowrap | 

|-
! 
| Alexander Smyth
|  | Jacksonian
| 18171828 1827
|  | Incumbent died April 17, 1830.New member elected November 1830.Jacksonian hold.Successor seated December 6, 1830.Winner was later elected to the next term, see below.
| nowrap | 

|-
! 
| Hector Craig
|  | Jacksonian
| 18221824 1828
|  | Incumbent resigned July 12, 1830.New member elected November 3, 1830.Anti-Jacksonian gain.Successor seated December 6, 1830.
| nowrap | 

|-
! 
| Philip P. Barbour
|  | Jacksonian
| 18151824 1827
|  | Incumbent resigned October 15, 1830, after being appointed judge of US Circuit Court of the Eastern District of Virginia.New member elected November 25, 1830.Jacksonian hold.Successor seated December 6, 1830.
| nowrap | 

|}

22nd Congress 

|-
! 
| colspan=3 | Vacant
|  | Vacancy in term.New member  elected in 1831Jacksonian gain.Successor seated May 12, 1831.
| nowrap | 

|-
! 
| Spencer D. Pettis
|  | Anti-Jacksonian
| 1824
|  | Incumbent died August 28, 1831.New member elected October 31, 1831.Anti-Jacksonian hold.Successor seated October 31, 1831.
| nowrap | 

|-
! 
| Rollin C. Mallary
|  | Anti-Jacksonian
| 1820 
|  | Incumbent died April 15, 1831.New member  elected November 1, 1831 on the third ballot.Anti-Masonic gain.Successor seated December 5, 1831.
| nowrap | :::

|-
! 
| William Ramsey
|  | Jacksonian
| 1826
|  | Incumbent died September 29, 1831, before the new Congress convened.New member elected November 22, 1831.Jacksonian hold.Successor seated December 5, 1831.
| nowrap | 

|-
! 
| Wilson Lumpkin
|  | Jacksonian
| 18141816 1826
|  | Incumbent resgined in 1831 before the convening of Congress.New member elected December 12, 1831.Jacksonian hold.Successor seated January 21, 1832.
| nowrap | 

|-
! 
| George Fisher
|  | Anti-Jacksonian
| 1828
|  | Incumbent lost contested election February 5, 1830 to Silas Wright, who in turn failed to qualify.New member elected November 3, 1830.Jacksonian gain.Winner was not a candidate the same day to the next term, see below.Successor seated December 6, 1830.
| nowrap | 

|-
! 
| Robert Potter
|  | Jacksonian
| 1829
|  | Incumbent resigned November ????, 1831.New member elected December 15, 1831.Jacksonian hold.Successor seated January 6, 1832.
| nowrap | 

|}

Alabama  

|-
! 
| Clement C. Clay
|  | Jacksonian
| 1829
| Incumbent re-elected.
| nowrap | 

|-
! 
| Robert E. B. Baylor
|  | Jacksonian
| 1825
|  | Incumbent lost-relection.New member elected.Jacksonian hold.
| nowrap | 

|-
! 
| Dixon Hall Lewis
|  | Jacksonian
| 1829
| Incumbent re-elected.
| nowrap | 

|}

Connecticut  

Connecticut elected its six at-large members on a general ticket on April 14, 1831, after the term began but before the Congress convened.

|-
! rowspan=6 | 
| Ralph I. Ingersoll
|  | Anti-Jacksonian
| 1825
| Incumbent re-elected.
| rowspan=6 nowrap | 

|-
| Noyes Barber
|  | Anti-Jacksonian
| 1821
| Incumbent re-elected.

|-
| Ebenezer Young
|  | Anti-Jacksonian
| 1829
| Incumbent re-elected.

|-
| Jabez W. Huntington
|  | Anti-Jacksonian
| 1829
| Incumbent re-elected.

|-
| William L. Storrs
|  | Anti-Jacksonian
| 1829
| Incumbent re-elected.

|-
| William W. Ellsworth
|  | Anti-Jacksonian
| 1829
| Incumbent re-elected.

|}

Delaware  

|-
! 
| Kensey Johns
|  | Anti-Jacksonian
| 1827 
|  | Incumbent retired.New member elected.Anti-Jacksonian hold.
| nowrap | 

|}

Georgia  

Georgia elected its 7 at-large members on October 4, 1830.

|-
! rowspan=7 | 
| Richard Henry Wilde
|  | Jacksonian
| 18141816 1824 1826 1827 
| Incumbent re-elected.
| rowspan=7 nowrap | 

|-
| Wilson Lumpkin
|  | Jacksonian
| 18141816 1826
| Incumbent re-elected.

|-
| Charles E. Haynes
|  | Jacksonian
| 1824
|  | Incumbent lost re-election.New member elected.Jacksonian hold.

|-
| Henry G. Lamar
|  | Jacksonian
| 1829 
| Incumbent re-elected.

|-
| Thomas F. Foster
|  | Jacksonian
| 1828
| Incumbent re-elected.

|-
| James M. Wayne
|  | Jacksonian
| 1828
| Incumbent re-elected.

|-
| Wiley Thompson
|  | Jacksonian
| 1820
| Incumbent re-elected.

|}

Illinois  

Illinois elected its sole member late on August 1, 1831.

|-
! 
| Joseph Duncan
|  | Jacksonian
| 1826
| Incumbent re-elected.
| nowrap | 

|}

Indiana  

Indiana elected its three members late on August 5, 1831.

|-
! 
| Ratliff Boon
|  | Jacksonian
| 1828
| Incumbent re-elected.
| nowrap | 

|-
! 
| Jonathan Jennings
|  | Anti-Jacksonian
| 1822 
|  | Incumbent lost re-election.New member elected.Jacksonian gain.
| nowrap | 

|-
! 
| John Test
|  | Anti-Jacksonian
| 1828
|  | Incumbent lost re-election.New member elected.Jacksonian gain.
| nowrap | 

|}

Kentucky  

|-
! 

|-
! 

|-
! 

|-
! 

|-
! 

|-
! 

|-
! 

|-
! 

|-
! 

|-
! 

|-
! 

|-
! 

|}

Louisiana  

|-
! 

|-
! 

|-
! 

|}

Maine  

|-
! 

|-
! 

|-
! 

|-
! 

|-
! 

|-
! 

|-
! 

|}

Maryland  

Maryland elected its nine members on October 3, 1831.  In the fifth district, two members were elected on a general ticket. There was a net gain of 2 Anti-Jacksonians thereby increasing their ratio from 3-to-6 to 5-to-4.

|-
! 
| Clement Dorsey
|  | Anti-Jacksonian
| 1824
|  | Incumbent retired.New member elected.Anti-Jacksonian hold.
| nowrap | 

|-
! 
| Benedict Joseph Semmes
|  | Anti-Jacksonian
| 1829
| Incumbent re-elected.
| nowrap | 

|-
! 
| George Corbin Washington
|  | Anti-Jacksonian
| 1826
| Incumbent re-elected.
| nowrap | 

|-
! 
| Michael Sprigg
|  | Jacksonian
| 1826
|  | Incumbent lost re-election.New member elected.Jacksonian hold.
| nowrap | 

|-
! rowspan=2 | 
| Benjamin C. Howard
|  | Jacksonian
| 1829
| Incumbent re-elected.
| rowspan=2 nowrap | 

|-
| Elias Brown
|  | Jacksonian
| 1829
|  | Incumbent lost re-election.New member elected.Jacksonian hold.

|-
! 
| George E. Mitchell
|  | Jacksonian
| 1829
| Incumbent re-elected.
| nowrap | 

|-
! 
| Richard Spencer
|  | Jacksonian
| 1829
|  | Incumbent lost re-election.New member elected.Anti-Jacksonian gain.
| nowrap | 

|-
! 
| Ephraim King Wilson
|  | Jacksonian
| 1829
|  | Incumbent retired.New member elected.Anti-Jacksonian gain.
| nowrap | 

|}

Massachusetts  

Elections were held November 1, 1830, but at least one district went to so many ballots it failed to achieve a majority election until 1832, just before the next cycle began.

(District numbers differ between sources. District numbers below reflect Martis's references. Where noted, Congressional Quarterly's "Guide to U.S. Elections" and OurCampaigns.com have different district numbers.)

|-
! 
| Benjamin Gorham
|  | Anti-Jacksonian
| 1820 1822 1827 
|  | Incumbent retired.New member elected.Anti-Jacksonian hold.
| nowrap | 

|-
! 
| Benjamin W. Crowninshield
|  | Anti-Jacksonian
| 1822
|  | Incumbent lost re-election from a different party.New member elected.Anti-Jacksonian hold.
| nowrap | 

|-
! 
| John Varnum
|  | Anti-Jacksonian
| 1824
|  | Incumbent retired.New member elected late on the thirteenth ballot.Anti-Jacksonian hold.
| nowrap | 

|-
! 
| Edward Everett
|  | Anti-Jacksonian
| 1824
| Incumbent re-elected. 
| nowrap | 

|-
! 
| John Davis
|  | Anti-Jacksonian
| 1824
| Incumbent re-elected.
| nowrap | 

|-
! 
| Joseph G. Kendall
|  | Anti-Jacksonian
| 1828
| Incumbent re-elected.
| nowrap | 

|-
! 
| George Grennell Jr.
|  | Anti-Jacksonian
| 1828
| Incumbent re-elected. 
| nowrap | 

|-
! 
| Isaac C. Bates
|  | Anti-Jacksonian
| 1826
| Incumbent re-elected. 
| nowrap | 

|-
! 
| Henry W. Dwight
|  | Anti-Jacksonian
| 1820
|  | Incumbent lost re-election.New member elected.Anti-Jacksonian hold.
| nowrap | 

|-
! 
| John Bailey
|  | Anti-Jacksonian
| 1823 1824 1824 
|  | Incumbent retired.New member elected.Anti-Jacksonian hold.
| nowrap | 

|-
! 
| Joseph Richardson
|  | Anti-Jacksonian
| 1826
|  | Incumbent retired.New member elected.Anti-Jacksonian hold.
| nowrap | 

|-
! 
| James L. Hodges
|  | Anti-Jacksonian
| 1827
| Incumbent re-elected late on the seventh ballot
| nowrap | 

|-
! 
| John Reed Jr.
|  | Anti-Jacksonian
| 18121816 1820
| Incumbent re-elected.
| nowrap | 

|}

Mississippi  

Elections held early, from August 2 to 3, 1830

|-
! 
| Thomas Hinds
|  | Jacksonian
| 1828 (special)
|  | Incumbent retired.New member elected.Jacksonian hold.
| nowrap | 

|}

Missouri  

Missouri elected its sole member late on August 2, 1831.

|-
! 
| Spencer D. Pettis
|  | Jacksonian
| 1828
| Incumbent re-elected.
| nowrap | 

|}

New Hampshire  

New Hampshire elected its six members at-large late on March 8, 1831.

|-
! rowspan=6 | 
| John Brodhead
|  | Jacksonian
| 1829
| Incumbent re-elected.
| rowspan=6 nowrap | 
|-
| Thomas Chandler
|  | Jacksonian
| 1829
| Incumbent re-elected.
|-
| Joseph Hammons
|  | Jacksonian
| 1829
| Incumbent re-elected.
|-
| Jonathan Harvey
|  | Jacksonian
| 1824
|  | Incumbent retired.New member elected.Jacksonian hold.
|-
| Henry Hubbard
|  | Jacksonian
| 1829
| Incumbent re-elected.
|-
| John W. Weeks
|  | Jacksonian
| 1829
| Incumbent re-elected.

|}

New Jersey  

New Jersey elected its six members at-large on November 6, 1830.

|-
! rowspan=6 | 
| Isaac Pierson
|  | Anti-Jacksonian
| 1826
|  | Incumbent lost renomination.New member elected.Anti-Jacksonian hold.
| rowspan=6 nowrap | 
|-
| Richard M. Cooper
|  | Anti-Jacksonian
| 1828
| Incumbent re-elected.
|-
| James F. Randolph
|  | Anti-Jacksonian
| 1828 
| Incumbent re-elected.
|-
| Thomas H. Hughes
|  | Anti-Jacksonian
| 1828
| Incumbent re-elected.
|-
| Samuel Swan
|  | Anti-Jacksonian
| 1820
|  | Incumbent retired.New member elected.Anti-Jacksonian hold.
|-
| Lewis Condict
|  | Anti-Jacksonian
| 1821 
| Incumbent re-elected.

|}

New York  

New York elected its 34 members from November 1 to 3, 1830.

|-
! 
| James Lent
|  | Jacksonian
| 1828
| Incumbent re-elected.
| nowrap | 

|-
! 
| Jacob Crocheron
|  | Jacksonian
| 1828
|  | Incumbent retired.New member elected.Jacksonian hold.
| nowrap | 

|-
! rowspan=3 | 
| Churchill C. Cambreleng
|  | Jacksonian
| 1821
| Incumbent re-elected.
| rowspan=3 nowrap | 
|-
| Campbell P. White
|  | Jacksonian
| 1828
| Incumbent re-elected.
|-
| Gulian C. Verplanck
|  | Jacksonian
| 1824
| Incumbent re-elected.

|-
! 
| Henry B. Cowles
|  | Anti-Jacksonian
| 1828
|  | Incumbent retired.New member elected.Jacksonian gain.
| nowrap | 

|-
! 
| Abraham Bockee
|  | Jacksonian
| 1828
|  | Incumbent lost renomination.New member elected.Anti-Jacksonian gain.
| nowrap | 

|-
! 
| colspan=3 | Vacant
|  | Rep. Hector Craig (J) resigned July 12, 1830.New member elected.Anti-Jacksonian gain.
| nowrap | 

|-
! 
| Charles G. DeWitt
|  | Jacksonian
| 1828
|  | Incumbent retired.New member elected.Jacksonian hold.
| nowrap | 

|-
! 
| James Strong
|  | Anti-Jacksonian
| 1822
|  | Incumbent retired.New member elected.Jacksonian gain.
| nowrap | 

|-
! 
| John D. Dickinson
|  | Anti-Jacksonian
| 1826
|  | Incumbent lost re-election.New member elected.Jacksonian gain.
| nowrap | 

|-
! 
| Ambrose Spencer
|  | Anti-Jacksonian
| 1828
|  | Incumbent lost re-election.New member elected.Jacksonian gain.
| nowrap | 

|-
! 
| Perkins King
|  | Jacksonian
| 1828
|  | Incumbent retired.New member elected.Jacksonian hold.
| nowrap | 

|-
! 
| Peter I. Borst
|  | Jacksonian
| 1828
|  | Incumbent retired.New member elected.Jacksonian hold.
| nowrap | 

|-
! 
| William G. Angel
|  | Jacksonian
| 1828
| Incumbent re-elected.
| nowrap | 

|-
! 
| Henry R. Storrs
|  | Anti-Jacksonian
| 1822
|  | Incumbent retired.New member elected.Jacksonian gain.
| nowrap | 

|-
! 
| Michael Hoffman
|  | Jacksonian
| 1824
| Incumbent re-elected.
| nowrap | 

|-
! 
| Benedict Arnold
|  | Anti-Jacksonian
| 1828
|  | Incumbent retired.New member elected.Jacksonian gain.
| nowrap | 

|-
! 
| John W. Taylor
|  | Anti-Jacksonian
| 1812
| Incumbent re-elected.
| nowrap | 

|-
! 
| Henry C. Martindale
|  | Anti-Jacksonian
| 1822
|  | Incumbent lost re-election.New member elected.Jacksonian gain.
| nowrap | 

|-
! 
| Isaac Finch
|  | Anti-Jacksonian
| 1828
|  | Incumbent retired.New member elected.Jacksonian gain.
| nowrap | 

|-
! rowspan=2 | 
| Joseph Hawkins
|  | Anti-Jacksonian
| 1828
|  | Incumbent retired.New member elected.Jacksonian gain.
| rowspan=2 nowrap | 
|-
| colspan=3 | Vacant
|  | Rep. George Fisher (AJ) resigned February 5, 1830 following election contest.New member elected.Jacksonian gain.

|-
! 
| colspan=3 | Vacant
|  | Rep. Robert Monell (J) resigned February 21, 1831 to become judge of the Sixth State Circuit Court.New member elected.Anti-Masonic gain.
| nowrap | 

|-
! 
| Thomas Beekman
|  | Anti-Jacksonian
| 1828
|  | Incumbent retired.New member elected.Jacksonian gain.
| nowrap | 

|-
! 
| Jonas Earll Jr.
|  | Jacksonian
| 1826
|  | Incumbent retired.New member elected.Jacksonian hold.
| nowrap | 

|-
! 
| Gershom Powers
|  | Jacksonian
| 1828
|  | Incumbent retired.New member elected.Jacksonian hold.
| nowrap | 

|-
! 
| Thomas Maxwell
|  | Jacksonian
| 1828
|  | Incumbent retired.New member elected.Anti-Masonic gain.
| nowrap | 

|-
! rowspan=2 | 
| Jehiel H. Halsey
|  | Jacksonian
| 1828
|  | Incumbent lost re-election.New member elected.Anti-Masonic gain.
| rowspan=2 nowrap | 
|-
| Robert S. Rose
|  | Anti-Masonic
| 1828
|  | Incumbent retired.New member elected.Anti-Masonic hold.

|-
! 
| Timothy Childs
|  | Anti-Masonic
| 1828
|  | Incumbent retired.New member elected.Anti-Masonic hold.
| nowrap | 

|-
! 
| John Magee
|  | Jacksonian
| 1826
|  | Incumbent lost re-election.New member elected.Anti-Masonic gain.
| nowrap | 

|-
! 
| Phineas L. Tracy
|  | Anti-Masonic
| 1827 
| Incumbent re-elected.
| nowrap | 

|-
! 
| Ebenezer F. Norton
|  | Jacksonian
| 1828
|  | Incumbent lost re-election.New member elected.Anti-Masonic gain.
| nowrap | 

|}

North Carolina  

North Carolina elected its members August 11, 1831, after the term began but before the new Congress convened.

|-
! 

|-
! 

|-
! 

|-
! 

|-
! 

|-
! 

|-
! 

|-
! 

|-
! 

|-
! 

|-
! 
| Henry W. Connor
|  | Jacksonian
| 1821
| Incumbent re-elected.
| nowrap | 

|}

Ohio  

|-
! 

|-
! 

|-
! 

|-
! 

|-
! 

|-
! 

|-
! 

|-
! 

|-
! 

|-
! 

|-
! 

|-
! 

|-
! 

|-
! 

|}

Pennsylvania  

|-
! 
| Joel B. Sutherland
|  | Jacksonian
| 1826
| Incumbent re-elected.
| nowrap | 

|-
! 
| Joseph Hemphill
|  | Jacksonian
| 18001802 18181826 1828
|  | Incumbent retired.New member elected.Jacksonian hold.
| nowrap | 

|-
! 
| Daniel H. Miller
|  | Jacksonian
| 1822
|  | Incumbent lost-relection.New member elected.Anti-Jacksonian gain.
| nowrap | 

|-
! rowspan=3 | 
| James Buchanan
|  | Jacksonian
| 1820
|  | Incumbent retired.New member elected.Anti-Masonic gain.
| rowspan=3 nowrap | 

|-
| Joshua Evans Jr.
|  | Jacksonian
| 1828
| Incumbent re-elected.

|-
| George G. Leiper
|  | Jacksonian
| 1828
|  | Incumbent retired.New member elected.Anti-Masonic gain.

|-
! 
| John B. Sterigere
|  | Jacksonian
| 1826
|  | Incumbent retired.New member elected.Jacksonian hold.
| nowrap | 

|-
! 
| Innis Green
|  | Jacksonian
| 1826
|  | Incumbent retired.New member elected.Jacksonian hold.
| nowrap | 

|-
! rowspan=2 | 
| Joseph Fry Jr.
|  | Jacksonian
| 1826
|  | Incumbent retired.New member elected.Jacksonian hold.
| rowspan=2 nowrap | 

|-
| Henry A. P. Muhlenberg
|  | Jacksonian
| 1828
| Incumbent re-elected.

|-
! rowspan=2 | 
| Peter Ihrie Jr.
|  | Jacksonian
| 1829 
| Incumbent re-elected.
| rowspan=2 nowrap | 

|-
| Samuel A. Smith
|  | Jacksonian
| 1829 
| Incumbent re-elected.

|-
! rowspan=3 | 
| Philander Stephens
|  | Jacksonian
| 1828
| Incumbent re-elected.
| rowspan=3 nowrap | 

|-
| James Ford
|  | Jacksonian
| 1828
| Incumbent re-elected.

|-
| Alem Marr
|  | Jacksonian
| 1828
|  | Incumbent retired.New member elected.Jacksonian hold.

|-
! 
| Adam King
|  | Jacksonian
| 1826
| Incumbent re-elected.
| nowrap | 

|-
! rowspan=2 | 
| Thomas H. Crawford
|  | Jacksonian
| 1828
| Incumbent re-elected.
| rowspan=2 nowrap | 

|-
| William Ramsey
|  | Jacksonian
| 1826
| Incumbent re-elected.

|-
! 
| John Scott
|  | Jacksonian
| 1828
|  | Incumbent lost-relection.New member elected.Anti-Masonic gain.
| nowrap | 

|-
! 
| Chauncey Forward
|  | Jacksonian
| 1826
|  | Incumbent retired.New member elected.Anti-Jacksonian gain.
| nowrap | 

|-
! 
| Thomas Irwin
|  | Jacksonian
| 1828
|  | Incumbent lost-relection.New member elected.Anti-Masonic gain.
| nowrap | 

|-
! 
| William McCreery
|  | Jacksonian
| 1828
|  | Incumbent lost-relection.New member elected.Anti-Masonic gain.
| nowrap | 

|-
! rowspan=2 | 
| Harmar Denny
|  | Anti-Masonic
| 1829 
| Incumbent re-elected.
| rowspan=2 nowrap | 

|-
| John Gilmore
|  | Jacksonian
| 1828
| Incumbent re-elected.

|-
! 
| Richard Coulter
|  | Jacksonian
| 1826
| Incumbent re-elected.
| nowrap | 

|-
! 
| Thomas H. Sill
|  | Anti-Jacksonian
| 1826 
|  | Incumbent retired.New member elected.Anti-Masonic gain.
| nowrap | 

|}

Rhode Island  

Rhode Island elected its two members at-large late on August 23, 1831.

|-
! rowspan=2 | 
| Tristam Burges
|  | Anti-Jacksonian
| 1825
| Incumbent re-elected.
| rowspan=2 nowrap | 
|-
| Dutee J. Pearce
|  | Anti-Jacksonian
| 1825
| Incumbent re-elected.

|}

South Carolina  

South Carolina elected its nine members from October 11 to 12, 1830.

|-
! 
| William Drayton
|  | Jacksonian
| 1825 
| Incumbent re-elected.
| nowrap | 

|-
! 
| Robert W. Barnwell
|  | Jacksonian
| 1828
|  | Incumbent re-elected to a new party.Nullifier gain.
| nowrap | 

|-
! 
| John Campbell
|  | Jacksonian
| 1828
|  | Incumbent lost re-election as a Nullifier.New member elected.Jacksonian hold.
| nowrap | 

|-
! 
| William D. Martin
|  | Jacksonian
| 1826
|  | Incumbent retired.New member elected.Jacksonian hold.
| nowrap | 

|-
! 
| George McDuffie
|  | Jacksonian
| 1820
|  | Incumbent re-elected to a new party.Nullifier gain.
| nowrap | 

|-
! 
| Warren R. Davis
|  | Jacksonian
| 1826
|  | Incumbent re-elected to a new party.Nullifier gain.
| nowrap | 

|-
! 
| William T. Nuckolls
|  | Jacksonian
| 1826
| Incumbent re-elected.
| nowrap | 

|-
! 
| James Blair
|  | Jacksonian
| 1828
| Incumbent re-elected.
| nowrap | 

|-
! 
| Starling Tucker
|  | Jacksonian
| 1816
|  | Incumbent retired.New member elected.Nullifier gain.
| nowrap | 

|}

Tennessee  

Election held late, on August 4, 1831.

|-
! 
| John Blair
|  | Jacksonian
| 1823
| Incumbent re-elected.
| nowrap | 

|-
! 
| Pryor Lea
|  | Jacksonian
| 1827
|  |Incumbent lost re-election.New member elected.Anti-Jacksonian gain.
| nowrap | 

|-
! 
| James I. Standifer
|  | Jacksonian
| 1829
| Incumbent re-elected.
| nowrap | 

|-
! 
| Jacob C. Isacks
|  | Jacksonian
| 1823
| Incumbent re-elected.
| nowrap | 

|-
! 
| Robert Desha
|  | Jacksonian
| 1827
|  |Incumbent retired.New member elected.Jacksonian hold.
| nowrap | 

|-
! 
| James K. Polk
|  | Jacksonian
| 1825
| Incumbent re-elected.
| nowrap | 

|-
! 
| John Bell
|  | Jacksonian
| 1827
| Incumbent re-elected.
| nowrap | 

|-
! 
| Cave Johnson
|  | Jacksonian
| 1829
| Incumbent re-elected.
| nowrap | 

|-
! 
| Davy Crockett
|  | Anti-Jacksonian
| 1827
|  | Incumbent lost re-election.New member elected.Jacksonian gain.
| nowrap | 
|}

Vermont  

Vermont elected its five members on September 6, 1830. Vermont required a majority vote for election, so the 3rd district election was settled on the second ballot on December 7, 1830, and the 4th district election was settled on the eleventh ballot on June 4, 1832.

|-
! 
| Jonathan Hunt
|  | Anti-Jacksonian
| 1827
| Incumbent re-elected.
| nowrap | 

|-
! 
| Rollin C. Mallary
|  | Anti-Jacksonian
| 1824
| Incumbent re-elected.
| nowrap | 

|-
! 
| Horace Everett
|  | Anti-Jacksonian
| 1828
| Incumbent re-elected.
| nowrap | 

|-
! 
| Benjamin Swift
|  | Anti-Jacksonian
| 1827
|  | Incumbent retired.New member elected.Anti-Jacksonian hold.
| nowrap | 

|-
! 
| William Cahoon
|  | Anti-Masonic
| 1829
| Incumbent re-elected.
| nowrap | 

|}

Virginia  

|-
! 
| George Loyall
|  | Jacksonian
| 1829
|  | Incumbent lost re-election.New member elected.Anti-Jacksonian gain.
| nowrap | 

|-
! 
| James Trezvant
|  | Jacksonian
| 1825
|  | Incumbent retired.New member elected.Jacksonian hold.
| nowrap | 

|-
! 
| William S. Archer
|  | Jacksonian
| 1820 
| Incumbent re-elected.
| nowrap | 

|-
! 
| Mark Alexander
|  | Jacksonian
| 1819
| Incumbent re-elected.
| nowrap | 

|-
! 
| Thomas Bouldin
|  | Jacksonian
| 1829
| Incumbent re-elected.
| nowrap | 

|-
! 
| Thomas Davenport
|  | Jacksonian
| 1825
| Incumbent re-elected.
| nowrap | 

|-
! 
| Nathaniel Claiborne
|  | Jacksonian
| 1825
| Incumbent re-elected.
| nowrap | 

|-
! 
| Richard Coke Jr.
|  | Jacksonian
| 1829
| Incumbent re-elected.
| nowrap | 

|-
! 
| Andrew Stevenson
|  | Jacksonian
| 1821
| Incumbent re-elected.
| nowrap | 

|-
! 
| William F. Gordon
|  | Jacksonian
| 1829 
| Incumbent re-elected.
| nowrap | 

|-
! 
| John M. Patton
|  | Jacksonian
| 1830 
| Incumbent re-elected.
| nowrap | 

|-
! 
| John Roane
|  | Jacksonian
| 1827
|  | Incumbent retired.New member elected.Jacksonian hold.
| nowrap | 

|-
! 
| John Taliaferro
|  | Anti-Jacksonian
| 1824 
|  | Incumbent lost re-election.New member elected.Jacksonian gain.
| nowrap | 

|-
! 
| Charles F. Mercer
|  | Anti-Jacksonian
| 1817
| Incumbent re-elected.
| nowrap | 

|-
! 
| John S. Barbour
|  | Jacksonian
| 1823
| Incumbent re-elected.
| nowrap | 

|-
! 
| William Armstrong
|  | Anti-Jacksonian
| 1825
| Incumbent re-elected.
| nowrap | 

|-
! 
| Robert Allen
|  | Jacksonian
| 1827
| Incumbent re-elected.
| nowrap | 

|-
! 
| Philip Doddridge
|  | Anti-Jacksonian
| 1829
| Incumbent re-elected.
| nowrap | 

|-
! 
| William McCoy
|  | Jacksonian
| 1811
| Incumbent re-elected.
| nowrap | 

|-
! 
| Robert Craig
|  | Jacksonian
| 1829
| Incumbent re-elected.
| nowrap | 

|-
! 
| Lewis Maxwell
|  | Anti-Jacksonian
| 1827
| Incumbent re-elected.
| nowrap | 

|-
! 
| Joseph Draper
|  | Jacksonian
| 1830 
|  | Incumbent lost re-election.New member elected.Jacksonian hold.
| nowrap | 

|}

Non-voting delegates

Arkansas Territory 

Arkansas elected its delegate late on September 4, 1831.

|-
! 
| Ambrose H. Sevier
|  | Jacksonian
| 1828 
| Incumbent re-elected.
| nowrap | 

|}

Florida Territory 

Florida elected its delegate on September 1, 1830.

|-
! 
| Joseph M. White
|  | Jacksonian
| 1825
| Incumbent re-elected.
| nowrap | 

|}

Michigan Territory 

Arkansas elected its delegate late on August 8, 1831.

|-
! 
| colspan=3 | Vacant
|  | Del. John Biddle (J) resigned February 21, 1831.New member elected.Anti-Jacksonian gain.
| nowrap | 

|}

See also 
 1830 United States elections
 List of United States House of Representatives elections (1824–1854)
 1830–31 United States Senate elections
 21st United States Congress
 22nd United States Congress

Notes

References

Bibliography

External links 
 Office of the Historian (Office of Art & Archives, Office of the Clerk, U.S. House of Representatives)